The Topeka Tropics are a professional indoor football in Champions Indoor Football.  Based in Topeka, Kansas, the Tropics play their home games at the Stormont Vail Events Center.  The team originally folded after its inaugural season, but was renewed for the 2023-2025 seasons.

History
The Tropics will be the third indoor football team to be based in Topeka following the Topeka Knights/Kings (1999–2000) and the Kansas Koyotes (2003–2014).

On August 9, 2021, Champions Indoor Football (CIF) announced an expansion team to be based in Topeka for the 2022 season with Sioux City Bandits' owner J. R. Bond serving as the team's owner. After a name-the-team contest was held, the Tropics name, logo, and color scheme were unveiled on September 8. Although Topeka does not have a tropical climate and is roughly 790 miles from the closest sea (the Gulf of Mexico), Bond chose the unusual name to symbolize how unconventional the Tropics organization would be both on and off the field. On October 5, the Tropics announced former Arena Football League player Tyus Jackson as its inaugural head coach.  On August 25, 2022, the Tropics announced that they would cease operations and not return for a second season; however, this decision was reversed later that same year </ref>

Notes

External links
 Official website
 Merchandise Website

Champions Indoor Football teams
American football teams in Kansas
Sports in Topeka, Kansas
American football teams established in 2021
2021 establishments in Kansas